Cecilia is a 1954 Norwegian drama film written and directed by Solvejg Eriksen, starring Anne-May Nilsen.

External links
 
 
 Cecilia at the Filmgrid.no

1954 films
1954 drama films
Norwegian drama films
Norwegian black-and-white films